Daniel Delray Lansanah (born August 28, 1985) is currently an unrestricted free agent. He was signed by the Green Bay Packers as an undrafted free agent in 2008. He played college football at Connecticut.

Lansanah has also been a member of the Detroit Lions, Hartford Colonials, Las Vegas Locomotives and New York Jets.

Professional career

New York Jets
Lansanah was signed to a reserve/future contract by the New York Jets on January 4, 2013. He was released on September 1, 2013. He was signed to the team's practice squad two days later. He was promoted to the active roster on September 7, 2013. He was released two days later.

Lansanah was signed to the team's practice squad on September 16, 2013.

Tampa Bay Buccaneers

2013 season
Lansanah was signed off the Jets' practice squad by the Tampa Bay Buccaneers on December 4, 2013 after a season-ending injury to linebacker Jonathan Casillas. He primarily was a practice squad and reserve line backer without any playing time.

2014 season
Lansanah got his 1st big break when he was promoted to starting Outside LB when injuries took LB Jonathan Casillas out action. Since becoming the starter Lansanah has thrived in Lovie Smith's Tampa 2 Defense finishing the 2014 season with 81 combined tackles (61 solo), 1.5 QB Sacks, and 3 interceptions with 2 of those interceptions returned for touchdowns. He was highly praised by Lovie and the defensive coaching staff for his versatility as an Inside and Outside Line Backer when he filled in for 2 games for an injured Lavonte David.

2015 season
Lansanah was offered and accepted his restricted free agent tender on March 5, 2015 to return to the Buccaneers for the 2015 season. He will have an opportunity to compete for a starting role as an outside linebacker.

Miami Dolphins
On August 3, 2016, the Miami Dolphins signed Lansanah to compete for the job as the backup middle linebacker against Neville Hewitt and Zach Vigil. He was waived on August 10, 2016.

References

External links
UConn Huskies bio
New York Jets bio

1985 births
Living people
Players of American football from Harrisburg, Pennsylvania
American football linebackers
UConn Huskies football players
Green Bay Packers players
Miami Dolphins players
Detroit Lions players
Hartford Colonials players
Las Vegas Locomotives players
New York Jets players
Tampa Bay Buccaneers players